Morad Kellal (born Bourg-en-Bresse, 23 May 1960) is a French-born Algerian rugby union coach. He was also a rugby union referee and a sport educator. 
Kellal is one of the main responsibles for the organization of rugby union in Algeria and his main purpose is the creation of an Algerian Rugby Federation. He was the first coach of Algeria national rugby union team.  Actually, he is teaching the art of rugby in Canada's schools, especially in the province of Quebec, trying to demystify that sport which is not as popular as it should be there.

External links
 

1960 births
Living people
French rugby union coaches
Algerian rugby union coaches
21st-century Algerian people
Sportspeople from Bourg-en-Bresse